Joonas Komulainen (born June 1, 1990) is a Finnish former ice hockey player. He played with KalPa, Oulun Kärpät, Lukko and Vaasan Sport in the Finnish Liiga.

Komulainen made his SM-liiga debut playing with Oulun Kärpät during the 2009–10 SM-liiga season.

On January 7, 2019 he announced his retirement due to an injury.

References

External links

1990 births
Living people
Finnish ice hockey forwards
Hokki players
KalPa players
Kiekko-Laser players
Lukko players
Oulun Kärpät players
People from Kuhmo
Vaasan Sport players
Sportspeople from Kainuu